Hwang Ui-jo (born 28 August 1992) is a South Korean professional footballer who plays as forward for K League 1 club FC Seoul, on loan from Nottingham Forest and the South Korea national team.

Club career

Seongnam FC
Hwang was selected by Seongnam Ilhwa Chunma in 2013 K League 1 draft. He scored his debut goal against Suwon Samsung Bluewings on 3 March 2013. During the 2015 season, he showed outstanding performances with 15 goals in the K League 1, and made his debut in the South Korean national team. He also scored three goals in the AFC Champions League. In 2016, however, Seongnam left poor results, and Hwang also underperformed at the time. They finished the league in 11th place among 12 clubs, and were eventually relegated to the K League 2 after the promotion-relegation playoffs.

Gamba Osaka
In June 2017, Hwang signed a two-year contract with J1 League club Gamba Osaka. In the 2018 season, he played a vital role for Gamba to avoid relegation, and finished the season as the team's top scorer with 21 goals. He was selected for the J.League Best XI and was named Gamba's Player of the Year.

Bordeaux
On 15 July 2019, Hwang moved to Ligue 1 club Bordeaux, signing a four-year deal worth €1.8 million per year. He originally played as a striker for the South Korean national team and Gamba Osaka, but the Bordeaux manager Paulo Sousa usually used him as a winger. Under Sousa, Hwang scored only six goals including a header scored against Paris Saint-Germain.

Hwang was continuously deployed as a winger early next season, although Sousa was replaced by Jean-Louis Gasset. However, he failed to score in 12 consecutive games, and scored his first goal of the season on 16 December. He was eventually returned to the striker position by Gasset, and successfully spent the remainder of the season by adding 11 goals.

On 23 January 2022, Hwang scored his first hat-trick of his Bordeaux's career, as the club won 4–3 against Strasbourg.

Nottingham Forest

Loan to Olympiacos
On 26 August 2022, Premier League club Nottingham Forest announced the signing of Hwang. He was immediately loaned out to Greek club Olympiacos.

Loan to FC Seoul
On 3 February 2023, Hwang Ui-jo was loaned out to South Korean club FC Seoul for 5 months until the summer.

International career
On 13 October 2015, Hwang scored his first international goal against Jamaica.

Hwang participated in the 2018 Asian Games as an over-aged player of the South Korean under-23 team. On 15 August, He scored a hat-trick in the first group-stage match against Bahrain. In the quarter-finals against Uzbekistan, he once again showed his explosive hat-trick, leading South Korea to a 4–3 victory. He scored nine goals out of seven matches, and his overwhelming performance greatly contributed to South Korea's gold medal. He was named the Korean FA Player of the Year after showing his worth in Asian Games and J1 League.

Hwang played for South Korea in the 2019 AFC Asian Cup, scoring against Philippines and China.

Hwang was also selected as an over-aged player for the under-23 team for the 2020 Summer Olympics. During the competition, he scored four goals, but failed to show great influence. South Korea was eliminated in the quarter-finals.

Career statistics

Club

International
Scores and results list South Korea's goal tally first, score column indicates score after each Hwang goal.

Honours
Seongnam FC
Korean FA Cup: 2014

South Korea U23
Asian Games: 2018

Individual
Asian Games top goalscorer: 2018
Korean FA Player of the Year: 2018
 J.League Best XI: 2018
Korean FA Goal of the Year: 2019

References

External links

 
 
 
 
 

1992 births
Living people
Yonsei University alumni
People from Seongnam
Association football forwards
South Korean footballers
South Korea under-17 international footballers
South Korea under-23 international footballers
South Korea international footballers
Seongnam FC players
Gamba Osaka players
FC Girondins de Bordeaux players
Nottingham Forest F.C. players
Olympiacos F.C. players
FC Seoul players
J1 League players
K League 1 players
K League 2 players
Ligue 1 players
Ligue 2 players
Premier League players
Super League Greece players
Footballers at the 2018 Asian Games
Asian Games medalists in football
Asian Games gold medalists for South Korea
Medalists at the 2018 Asian Games
2019 AFC Asian Cup players
South Korean expatriate footballers
South Korean expatriate sportspeople in Japan
Expatriate footballers in Japan
South Korean expatriate sportspeople in France
Expatriate footballers in France
South Korean expatriate sportspeople in England
Expatriate footballers in England
South Korean expatriate sportspeople in Greece
Expatriate footballers in Greece
Footballers at the 2020 Summer Olympics
Olympic footballers of South Korea
Sportspeople from Gyeonggi Province
2022 FIFA World Cup players